The seventh and final season of Malcolm in the Middle premiered on September 30, 2005, on Fox, and ended on May 14, 2006, with a total of 22 episodes. Frankie Muniz stars as the title character Malcolm, and he is joined by Jane Kaczmarek, Bryan Cranston, Christopher Kennedy Masterson, Justin Berfield and Erik Per Sullivan.

Episodes

Cast and characters

Main 
 Frankie Muniz as Malcolm
 Jane Kaczmarek as Lois
 Bryan Cranston as Hal
 Christopher Kennedy Masterson as Francis
 Justin Berfield as Reese
 Erik Per Sullivan as Dewey

Recurring 
 David Anthony Higgins as Craig Feldspar
 Craig Lamar Traylor as Stevie Kenarban
 Gary Anthony Williams as Abe Kenarban
 Hayden Panettiere as Jessica
 Cloris Leachman as Ida
 Rheagan Wallace as Raduca
 Emy Coligado as Piama

Production 
In March–April 2005, Fox renewed Malcolm in the Middle for a seventh season. The following month, it was reported that series creator Linwood Boomer would not continue as showrunner, instead retaining an "executive consultant credit" while Matthew Carlson, would replace Boomer as showrunner. In January 2006, it was announced that it would be the final season; the decision behind this was widely attributed to declining viewership. Main cast members Frankie Muniz, Jane Kaczmarek, Bryan Cranston, Christopher Kennedy Masterson, Justin Berfield and Erik Per Sullivan return as Malcolm, Lois, Hal, Francis, Reese and Dewey respectively. As with the sixth season, Masterson made fewer appearances than the rest of the main cast.

Release

Broadcast history 
The season premiered on September 30, 2005 on Fox, and ended on May 14, 2006 with a total of 22 episodes.

Home media 
The season was released on Region 2 DVD on October 7, 2013, and on Region 4 DVD on September 4, 2013.

Reception 
In his review of the series finale, Matthew Gilbert of The Boston Globe said it "sails by, with none of the grandstanding and schmaltz many finales rely on to make an ending profound." Alan Pergament of The Buffalo News said, "Since it isn't exactly a warm and fuzzy comedy, you shouldn't expect Malcolm to get sappy at the end. Fortunately, it strikes a nice balance between maintaining its insanity (there's a messy explosion), having a few sweet moments and a suitably nightmarish ending." Rob Owen of Pittsburgh Post-Gazette said, "At a half-hour, it's not a bloated finale, nor is it particularly memorable, but this last "Malcolm" does send the show out in a style that's familiar to the show's fans."

At the 58th Primetime Emmy Awards, the season received four nominations: Outstanding Lead Actress in a Comedy Series for Kaczmarek, Outstanding Supporting Actor in a Comedy Series for Cranston, Outstanding Guest Actress in a Comedy Series for Cloris Leachman and Outstanding Choreography for Fred Tallaksen for the episode "Bomb Shelter"; Leachman was the only winner.

References 

2005 American television seasons
2006 American television seasons
Malcolm in the Middle